La Vue (formerly known as Prospect Vue) is an historic home located in Spotsylvania County, Virginia. The home was built in 1848 by George Alsop for his son, John. La View was added to the National Register of Historic Places in January 1994.

The two-story, ell-shaped house sits on top of a steep hill so as to provide a view of the surrounding fields.

References

Houses on the National Register of Historic Places in Virginia
Greek Revival houses in Virginia
Houses completed in 1848
Houses in Spotsylvania County, Virginia
National Register of Historic Places in Spotsylvania County, Virginia